The Gospel of Inhumanity is the first album by Blood Axis. Conceived in the winter of 1994/95, it was performed, recorded and engineered at Absinthe Studios (Denver, Colorado) by Michael Jenkins Moynihan and Robert Ferbrache.

The album incorporates music by Giuseppe Verdi, Johann Sebastian Bach and Sergei Prokofiev, such as "Montagues and Capulets"; lyrics by Friedrich Nietzsche and Henry Wadsworth Longfellow; the voices of Ezra Pound and Charles Manson; and samples from The Wicker Man and A Clockwork Orange.

Track listing
"The Gospel of Inhumanity" – 5:47
"The Voyage (Canto I)" – 4:34 (lyrics)
"Eternal Soul" – 4:04	
"Between Birds of Prey" – 8:16	
"Herr, nun laß in Frieden" – 5:02
"Reign I Forever" – 6:15 (lyrics)
"Absinthe" – 7:07
"Storm of Steel" – 10:56

External links
 The Gospel of Inhumanity at Discogs.
 The Gospel of Inhumanity reviewed at Chronicles of Chaos by Andrew Lewandowski.

1995 debut albums
Blood Axis albums